Jeanne Delay (May 18, 1920 – October 6, 2012), was a female French international table tennis player.

She won a bronze medal at the 1949 World Table Tennis Championships in the Corbillon Cup (women's team event) with Huguette Béolet and Yolande Vannoni for France.

She also won five French national titles from 1937 to 1949 which included four singles titles.

See also
 List of table tennis players
 List of World Table Tennis Championships medalists

References

French female table tennis players
1920 births
2012 deaths
World Table Tennis Championships medalists
20th-century French women
21st-century French women